Beqaa is a governorate in Lebanon.

Districts
Since 2014, Beqaa Governorate contains three districts:
 West Beqaa
 Rashaya
 Zahle

A law was passed in 2003 to separate Baalbek District and Hermel District from Beqaa Governorate to form a new governorate, Baalbek-Hermel Governorate. Implementation of Baalbek-Hermel began in 2014 with the appointment of its first governor.

Demographics 

According to voter registration data, the governorate is approximately 41% Christian to 52% Muslim to 7% Druze (313505 voters).

In the district (qadaa) of Zahlé (meaning an area much greater than that of the city proper), Christians form a majority of 55% of voters (172555 in total).
In the district of West Beqaa-Rashaya (the two are combined as an electoral district), Christians account for 22.22% of voters (140950 in total).

References

  

 
Governorates of Lebanon